Damodar Gulati (Punjabi: ਦਮੋਦਰ ਦਾਸ ਅਰੋੜਾ) also known as Damodar Das Arora (1605-1656), was a Punjabi poet. He hailed from Jhang. He lived during the reign of Mughal king Akbar. He wrote the qissa Heer and Ranjha, adapted from a legend. .He claims to be the eye witness of this tale. His Qissa/story is deemed the oldest and the first Heer in Punjabi literature . He states in the poem that he is from Jhang—the home of Heer, one of the poem's two main characters. He wrote this Heer in the dialect of Sandal Bar , despite this fact after the lapse of five hundred years the language used in the story is nearer to modern Majhai /Majhil dialect. He does have also a peculiar style ,at the end of a quaternary he repeats Aakkh Damodar means Say Damodar ,

Aakkh Damodar mein Akkhi ditha laggi hon Ladai

(Say Damodar I witnessed with my eyes the battle started )

Nak tey kan tinhan da wadhaiy jo chori, yari karaindey

Doja nak tinhan da wadhaiy jo haq pariaya lendey

Teja nak tinhan da wadhaiy jo koi wadhi khandey

Aakkh Damodar jinha sach sanjhatey sey bhashti jandey

(Amputate the ears and nose of those who commit theft and have extra marital affairs,

Second chop off the nose of those who usurp the right of others,

Third hack off the nose of those who accept bribe,

Say Damodar only those will go to paradise who recognize the truth)

Toun keyoun zori karna ain qazi dery Khuda tu naheen

Mera haq Ranjheeta ay,ho suneya subh lokai

ley key wadhi haq ganvain kadh kitab vakkhai

Aakkh Damodar Heer Akkhey qazi subh Sharah (shariah) takai.

(Why do you compel me, O,qazi don't you have fear of God,

Ranjheeta is mine, all the people know

You (qazi) have accepted bribe, infringed my right,showing the book (shariah)

Say Damodar, Heer tells qazi showed her the whole Shariah. According to the Encyclopædia of Indian Literature, Gulati's work had Sikh influences. Waris Shah later adapted Heer and Ranjha.

References

Further reading 

  Selections from Gulati's Heer and Ranjha.
Punjabi-language poets
Punjabi people
Heer Ranjha